Bear Creek is a township in Dickey County, North Dakota, United States. The population was 193 at the 2010 census.

References

Townships in Dickey County, North Dakota